Cetraria aculeata or the spiny Iceland lichen is a dark brown to black fruticose, soil Iceland lichen from the family Parmeliaceae. The species was first described by German naturalist Johann Christian Daniel Edler von Schreber in 1771 under the name of Lichen aculeatus. Later on Erik Acharius, the "father of lichenology" gave it a name of Cornicularia aculeata, which lately has been changed to Coelocaulon aculeatum. Finally the taxonomic revision of Ingvar Kärnefelt and colleagues assigned the species to the genus Cetraria.

The thalli of Cetraria aculeata form shrubby tufts of up to 1–5 cm height, main branches are from 1 to 4 mm wide, terminal branches up to 1 mm wide, chemical tests K - and P -. The species is found fertile, and seems to propagate mainly by thallus fragmentation. Despite the apparent lack of ascospores, which can be dispersed across long distances, C. aculeata has a very wide distribution. It is frequent in open polar and boreal environments from the maritime Antarctic to the high Arctic. At intermediate latitudes it is mostly found in high mountain ecosystems, as well as its distributional range also extends into forest gaps, woodland and steppe ecosystems, or coastal and riparian sand deposits of the Mediterranean and temperate zones.

There are several morphologically very similar and genetically closely related species that are united under the name of Cetraria aculeata complex. It consists of as many as six species: C. muricata, C. crespoae, C. steppae, C. odontella, C. australiensis and not published yet C. panamericana. The phenomenon observed is due to existence of so-called cryptic species, which has been reported for many groups of organisms.

Ecology
Cetraria aculeata is a known host to several lichenicolous fungus species, including Lichenopeltella cetrariicola, Acremonium lichenicola, Clypeococcum cetrariae, Didymocyrtis cladoniicola, Didymocyrtis trassii, Endococcus parmeliarum, Lichenoconium eroden, Eonema pyriforme, Katherinomyces cetrariae, Sphaerellothecium aculeatae, and Taeniolella rolfii.

References

Parmeliaceae
Lichen species
Lichens of Antarctica
Lichens of Europe
Lichens described in 1771
Taxa named by Johann Christian Daniel von Schreber